Mohaideen Andavar Mosque in Thirukkalachery has an important history to this building. It is located in Mosque Street (also called Pallivaasal Street; pallivaasal in Tamil means "mosque").

History
This mosque got its name when it was originally built in the land donated by local philanthropist in 1936 and through donations from Indian immigrants from Malaya (now Malaysia) and French Indochina (now Vietnam). Donations were collected mainly by Pitchai Ghani Rawuthar and Ave Mohamed Yusuf (both now deceased). 
 
This mosque was then re-built in 1990 by Ave Mohamed Yusuf's son, Ave Abdul Hameed with his own funds without any donations from the public. However, Ave Abdul Hameed's son Ave Abdul Bachir had said that he had donated US$100,000 (approximately evquivilant to about 4 Million Indian Rupees then) in a single payment from Switzerland towards the reconstruction of this mosque. No other reliable donation details within the Ave's family or his other children were available while he was still alive after the construction of this mosque.

This mosque still retains the name Mohaideen Andawar Mosque or Mohaideen Andawar Jamea Masjid. This is one of the biggest mosques (with a unique large dome similar like Prophet Muhammad's Mosque in Medina, Saudi Arabia) in Nagapattinam district of Tamil Nadu, India.

See also
 Islam in India

Mosques in Tamil Nadu
Mosques completed in 1936
Buildings and structures in Nagapattinam district